Lucius Cassius Dio, also known as Dio Cassius, was a Roman historian and senator of maternal Greek origin. He published 80 volumes of the history on ancient Rome, beginning with the arrival of Aeneas in Italy. The volumes documented the subsequent founding of Rome (753 BC), the formation of the Republic (509 BC), and the creation of the Empire (27 BC), up until 229 AD. Written in Ancient Greek over 22 years, Dio's work covers approximately 1,000 years of history. Many of his 80 books have survived intact, or as fragments, providing modern scholars with a detailed perspective on Roman history.

Biography
Lucius Cassius Dio was the son of Cassius Apronianus, a Roman senator and member of the gens Cassia, who was born and raised at Nicaea in Bithynia. Byzantine tradition maintains that Dio's mother was the daughter or sister of the Greek orator and philosopher, Dio Chrysostom; however, this relationship has been disputed. Although Dio was a Roman citizen, he wrote in Greek. Dio always maintained a love for his hometown of Nicaea, calling it "my home", as opposed to his description of his villa in Capua, Italy ("the place where I spend my time whenever I am in Italy").

For the greater part of his life, Dio was a member of the public service. He was a senator under Commodus and governor of Smyrna following the death of Septimius Severus; he became a suffect consul in approximately the year 205. Dio was also proconsul in Africa and Pannonia. Severus Alexander held Dio in the highest esteem and reappointed him to the position of consul, even though his caustic nature irritated the Praetorian Guards, who demanded his life. Following his second consulship, while in his later years, Dio returned to his native country, where he eventually died.

Dio was either the grandfather or great-grandfather of Cassius Dio, consul in 291.

Roman History 
Dio published a Roman History, in 80 books, after twenty-two years of research and labour. The books cover a period of approximately 1,400 years, beginning with the tales from Roman mythology of the arrival of the legendary Aeneas in Italy and the founding of Rome by his descendant Romulus (753 BC); as well as the historic events of the republican and imperial eras through 229 AD. The work is one of only three written Roman sources that document the British revolt of 60–61 AD led by Boudica and the subsequent defeat of Boudica. Until the first century BC, Dio provides only a summary of events; after that period, his accounts become more detailed. From the time of Commodus (ruled 180–192 AD), Dio is very circumspect in his conveyance of the events that he witnessed.

The version of Dio's work that survives today is quite composite since his history does not survive in its entirety.

Dio's work has often been deprecated as unreliable and lacking any overall political aim. Recently, however, some scholars have re-evaluated his work and have highlighted his complexity and sophisticated political and historical interpretations.

Survey of surviving books and fragments
The first 21 books have been partially reconstructed based on fragments from other works, as well as the epitome of Zonaras who used Dio's Roman History as a main source. Scholarship on this part of Dio's work is scarce but the importance of the Early Republic and Regal period to Dio's overall work has recently been underlined.

Books 22 through 35 are sparsely covered by fragments.

The books that follow, Books 36 through 54, are nearly all complete; they cover the period from 65 BC to 12 BC, or from the eastern campaign of Pompey and the death of Mithridates to the death of Marcus Vipsanius Agrippa. Book 55 contains a considerable gap, while Books 56 through 60 (which cover the period from 9–54 AD) are complete and contain events from the defeat of Varus in Germany to the death of Claudius.

Of the 20 subsequent books in the series, there remain only fragments and the meager abridgement of John Xiphilinus, a monk from the 11th century. The abridgment of Xiphilinus, as now extant, commences with Book 35 and continues to the end of Book 80: it is a very indifferent performance and was made by order of the emperor Michael VII Doukas. The last book covers the period from 222 to 229 AD (the first half of the reign of Alexander Severus).

Collections of book fragments
The fragments of the first 36 books have been collected in four ways:

Fragmenta Valesiana Fragments that were dispersed throughout various writers, scholiasts, grammarians, and lexicographers, and were collected by Henri Valois

Fragmenta Peiresciana Large extracts, found in the section entitled "Of Virtues and Vices", contained in the collection, or portative library, compiled by order of Constantine VII Porphyrogenitus. The manuscript of this belonged to Nicolas-Claude Fabri de Peiresc.

Fragmenta Ursiniana The fragments of the first 34 books, preserved in the second section of the same work by Constantine, entitled “Of Embassies”. These are known under the name of Fragmenta Ursiniana, as the manuscript in which they are contained was found in Sicily by Fulvio Orsini.

Excerpta Vaticana Excerpta Vaticana by Angelo Mai contains fragments of Books 1 to 35 and 61 to 80. Additionally, fragments of an unknown continuator of Dio (Anonymus post Dionem), generally identified with the 6th century CE historian Peter the Patrician, are included; these date from the time of Constantine. Other fragments from Dio that are primarily associated with the first 34 books were found by Mai in two Vatican manuscripts; these contain a collection that was compiled by Maximus Planudes. The annals of Joannes Zonaras also contain numerous extracts from Dio.

Literary style

Dio attempted to emulate Thucydides in his writing style. His style, where there appears to be no corruption of the text, is generally clear though full of Latinisms. Dio's writing was underpinned by a set of personal circumstances whereby he was able to observe significant events of the Empire in the first person, or had direct contact with the key figures who were involved.

In popular culture
The first season of 2017 docu-drama mini-series Roman Empire: Reign of Blood includes Cassius Dio, portrayed by Edwin Wright.  Dio is shown engaging in delicate political manipulation, playing a key role in the downfall of Marcus Aurelius Cleander, trusted advisor to the Emperor Commodus, and ultimately in the murder of Commodus himself.

See also 
Tacitus
Severan dynasty
Herodian
Roman historiography

Notes

References

Further reading
 Aalders, G. J. D. 1986. "Cassius Dio and the Greek World." Mnemosyne 39: 282–304.
 Baltussen, Han. 2002. "Matricide Revisited: Dramatic and Rhetorical Allusion in Tacitus, Suetonius and Cassius Dio." Antichthon 36: 30–40.
Burden-Strevens, C. and Lindholmer, M. O. 2018 (eds.). Cassius Dio's Forgotten History of Early Rome: The Roman History. Leiden: Brill.
 Eisman, M. M. 1977. "Dio and Josephus: Parallel Analyses." Latomus 36: 657–673.
Fromentin, V., Bertrand, E. Coltelloni-Trannoy, M., Molin, M and Urso, G. (eds.) 2016. Cassius Dion: nouvelles lectures. Bordeaux: Ausonius.
 Gleason, Maud. 2011. "Identity Theft: Doubles and Masquerades in Cassius Dio's Contemporary History." Classical Antiquity 30.1: 33–86.
 Gowing, Alain M. 1990. "Dio’s Name." Classical Philology 85: 49–54.
 Kordos, Jozef. 2010. "Thucydidean Elements in Cassius Dio." Acta Antiqua Academiae Scientiarum Hungaricae 50.2-3:249-256.
Lange, C. H. and Madsen, J. M. 2016 (eds.). Cassius Dio: Greek Intellectual and Roman Politician. Leiden: Brill.
 Mallan, C. T. 2013. "Cassius Dio on Julia Domna: A Study of the Political and Ethical Functions of Biographical Representation in Dio's Roman History." Mnemosyne 66.4-5: 734–760.
 McDougall, Iain. 1991. "Dio and His Sources for Caesar’s Campaigns in Gaul." Latomus 50: 616–638.
 Millar, F. G. B. 1964. A Study of Cassius Dio. Oxford: Oxford Univ. Press.
 Murison, C. L. 1999. Rebellion and Reconstruction: Galba to Domitian: An Historical Commentary on Cassius Dio’s Roman History. Books 64–67 (A.D. 68–96). Atlanta: Scholars Press.
 Reinhold, Meyer. 1988. From Republic to Principate. An Historical Commentary on Cassius Dio's Roman History Books 49-52 (36-29 B.C.). Atlanta: Scholars Press.
 Swan, P.M. 2004. The Augustan Succession. An Historical Commentary on Cassius Dio's Roman History Books 55-56 (9 B.C.-A.D.14). Oxford: Oxford University Press.

External links

 
 
 
 
 
 Cassius Dio, Roman History (English translation on LacusCurtius)
 Works by Cassius Dio at Perseus Digital Library
 Greek text and French Translation
 Dio Cassius: the Manuscripts of "The Roman History"
 Editio princeps: Dionis Romanarum historiarum libri XXIII, à XXXVI ad LVIII vsque (The Roman History) , Greek text edited by Robert Estienne, Paris, 1548. Held by the Corning Museum of Glass.
 Editio princeps of Xiphilinus's Epitome (Robert Estienne, Paris, 1551) at Google Books

150s births
230s deaths
3rd-century historians
2nd-century Greek people
3rd-century Greek people
2nd-century Romans
3rd-century Romans
Dio
Imperial Roman consuls
Historians from Roman Anatolia
People from Nicaea
Greek-language historians from the Roman Empire
Roman governors of Africa
Year of birth uncertain
Year of death uncertain